Vyšná Myšľa is a village and municipality in Košice-okolie District in the Kosice Region of eastern Slovakia.

History
In historical records the village was first mentioned in 1270.

Geography
The village lies at an altitude of 185 metres and covers an area of 8.867 km². It has a population of 888 people.

Ethnicity
The population is almost entirely Slovak in ethnicity.

Culture
The village has a public library, a football playground and food stores.

Transport
The village has a railway station. It is 17 km to Košice.

External links

Villages and municipalities in Košice-okolie District